Utata (Utaata) is a rural locality (an ulus) in Zakamensky District, Republic of Buryatia, Russia. The population was 653 as of 2010. There are 10 streets.

Geography 
Utata is located 90 km northwest of Zakamensk (the district's administrative centre) by road. Sanaga is the nearest rural locality.

References 

Rural localities in Zakamensky District